The M21 Sniper Weapon System (SWS) in the US Army is a national match grade M14 rifle, selected for accuracy, and renamed the M21 rifle. The M21 uses a commercially procured 3–9× variable power telescopic sight, modified for use with the sniper rifle. It is chambered for the 7.62×51mm NATO cartridge.

Overview

The use of "sharpshooters" (or snipers) can be traced in U.S. military history from the time of the Revolutionary War of 1775–1781.  Every U.S. military action since that time has required the special talent of such men. From 1955–1956, the  United States Army Marksmanship Training Unit undertook a program to "reiterate the lessons learned" from past wars.  However, this program was short-lived. The prevailing military attitude then envisioned any future conflict as nuclear with defeat or victory decided in hours.

With the adoption of the M14 service rifle no provision was made for an M14 sniper rifle, [and] the designation of a sniper in the rifle squad was discontinued.  The conflict in Vietnam revived the need for snipers. Snipers became optional and no table of organization and equipment (TOE) authorized sniper organizations [units]." However, units could train and deploy snipers on a limited basis depending upon...requirements.  As a result, U.S. Army snipers were trained in country in South Vietnam at Division. During the Vietnam War, U.S. Marines were issued bolt-action hunting rifles, U.S. Soldiers were issued XM21 rifles.  The Rock Island Arsenal converted 1,435 National Match (target grade) M14s by adding a 3-9x Redfield Adjustable Ranging Telescope (ART) and provided National Match grade (7.62 Lake City Long Range XM-118) ammunition. The ART scope, designed by 2nd Lieutenant James Leatherwood (U.S. Army), combined rangefinding and bullet drop compensation. The innovation came just in time as the U.S. military found itself losing servicemen to Viet Cong snipers who had the home field advantage in terrain that was, to say the least, difficult.

This version, designated as the XM21, had a specially selected walnut stock and was first fielded in the second half of 1969. An improved version with a fiberglass stock was designated the M21 in 1972. The M21 remained the Army's primary sniper rifle until 1988, when it was replaced by the M24 Sniper Weapon System; some M21s were later re-issued and used in the Iraq War.

In standard military use, the M21 uses a 20-round box magazine as the other members of the M14 family and weighs 11 pounds (5.27 kg) without the scope. The U.S. military never officially authorized or purchased magazines in any other capacity, although 5- and 10-round magazines are available.

The M21 was criticized by an internal Fort Benning publication in 1989 warning that "The M21...cannot be maintained under field conditions, and its inflexible design makes it highly susceptible to malfunctions" due to the scope not being easily removable if needed and the glass bedded action that made disassembly in the field problematic.

M21A5 "Crazy Horse"

The goal of the Crazy Horse rifle project was to offer current military units a reliable and cost-effective modernization program for Squad Designated Marksmen (SDM) using existing M14 rifles in inventory. The Crazy Horse rifle was designed in conjunction with the Picatinny Arsenal and the United States Army Infantry School.

The Crazy Horse rifle is built by Smith Enterprise Inc. and is used by various units within the US Military as the M21A5 and the M14SE. The Crazy Horse's metal components are cryogenically treated prior to assembly, which eliminates the need for bedding the stock with fiberglass and steel inserts. Additional upgrades include a completely adjustable trigger system (from 2.5 to 5 lbs) and an extended bolt handle for use in extreme cold environments.

The chamber is hand cut using chamber reamers specially designed for the M118LR round. Smith Enterprise Inc. is the only civilian rifle builder who uses these reamers. The gas system is unitized and hardened via Melonite. The gas piston is hard chromed to tolerances to ensure a precision fit within the hardened gas cylinder. Unlike traditional M14 rifles, the front sight is mounted on the gas block as opposed to the muzzle to allow use of a direct-connect sound suppressor that mounts to the Vortex Flash Hider. The scope is mounted to the rifle using a SEI scope mount and ring package made via electrical discharge machining (EDM).

Service
The XM21 Sniper Weapon System was issued to U.S. Army snipers during the Vietnam War, along with a commercially available sniper scope for day use, and a PVS-2 starlight scope for night operations. These men were trained at Army Division Base Camps; if a unit in country was a Brigade, Battalion, or  smaller, and that unit requested snipers for their units, the requesting unit could send their sniper applicant to the next closest Division, such as Camp Eagle, 101st (Airmobile) Airborne Division, if that requesting unit was located in I Corps (Military Region 1), Republic of South Vietnam.  The newly designated M21 saw limited actions during military operations after the Vietnam War ended in 1975. It was used by the U.S. Army Rangers during the Invasion of Grenada in 1983. There are limited numbers in some Army National Guard units and in a few specialized active units such as the OPFOR units of the Joint Readiness Training Center. The XM21 served from 1969 to 1975, and the M21 officially served as the main Army sniper rifle from 1975 to 1988 until the introduction of the M24, which had supplanted the M21 in Ranger Battalions by 1990. However, many M14 and M21 variants came back into favor in the Iraq and Afghan wars in the 2000s.

Users
 
 
 
 
  Formerly used by the defunct Panama Defense Forces

See also
 M24 Sniper Weapon System
 M25 Sniper Weapon System
 Springfield Armory M1A

References

External links

 SniperCentral's page about the M21
 Brief M21 description and history from the U.S. Army.
 M21 on Global Security.org (the same text can be found at FAS.org)
 M25 at SniperParadise.com
 M25 at AnySoldier.com

7.62×51mm NATO semi-automatic rifles
Sniper rifles of the United States
Military equipment introduced in the 1960s